John Harper may refer to:

Arts and entertainment
John Harper (actor) (died 1742), English comic actor 
John Harper (architect) (1809–1842), English architect
John Russell Harper (1914–1983), Canadian art historian
John Harper (church musician), former director of the Royal School of Church Music
Johnny Harper, fictional character in The O.C.

Politicians
John Adams Harper (1779–1816), American politician from New Hampshire
John Harper (mayor) (1825–1874), mayor of Denver, Colorado, U.S.A, 1871–1872
John Harper (Kentucky politician) (1930–2001), American politician from Kentucky
John Joseph Harper (1951–1988), Canadian aboriginal leader from Wasagamack, Manitoba

Others
John Ernest Harper (1874–1949), British admiral
John Harper (baseball), Negro league baseball player
John Harper (computer engineer) (born 1937), British computer engineer who led the Bombe rebuild at Bletchley Park
John Harper (footballer) (born 1883), Scottish footballer
John Harper (gridiron football), Canadian football player
John Harper (pastor) (1872–1912), British Baptist pastor who died on the Titanic
John L. Harper (1925–2009), British biologist
John William Harper (1916–1944), English recipient of the Victoria Cross

See also
Jack Harper (disambiguation)
Jon Harper (born 1978), British musician